Bettiol is a surname of Italian origin. Notable people with the surname include:

Alberto Bettiol (born 1993), Italian road racing cyclist
Grégory Bettiol (born 1986), French footballer
Italo Bettiol (1926–2022), Italian-French film director
Salvatore Bettiol (born 1961), Italian long-distance runner

Italian-language surnames